Puntius aphya is a species of ray-finned fish in the genus Puntius native to freshwater habitats in Java, Indonesia. It is only known from a single old specimen, but its validity is questionable and recent authorities treat it as a synonym of Leptobarbus hoevenii.

References 

aphya
Freshwater fish of Indonesia
Fish described in 1868
Taxa named by Albert Günther